Stewart Dickson (born 8 December 1950) is an Alliance Party of Northern Ireland politician who has been a Member of the Northern Ireland Assembly (MLA) for  East Antrim since 2011.

Political career

Councillor (1977-1981, 1985-2011) 
Dickson entered politics in 1977, when he was elected to Carrickfergus Borough Council representing Area A, the predecessor of the Knockagh Monument electoral area. He lost his seat to the Democratic Unionist Party in the 1981 local elections but regained it at the 1985 local elections and has been re-elected at each local election since then. He served as Mayor from 1992 to 1993.

Member of the Legislative Assembly (2011-) 
He ran as the 2nd Alliance Party candidate in East Antrim from the 1996 Northern Ireland Forum to the 2007 Assembly Elections, alongside Seán Neeson but was not elected until the 2011 Assembly Elections; where he inherited Seán Neeson's seat following his retirement.

Dickson was re-elected at the subsequent 2016 and 2017 Assembly Elections, and was returned again in the 2022 Assembly Elections alongside his running mate Danny Donnelly - who gained a seat from the UUP's Roy Beggs.

Personal life 
Stewart is a Trustee of the NI Cancer Charity, OG Cancer NI having been diagnosed with Oesophageal Cancer in July 2019 and underwent major surgery later that year.

Outside political life, he is a retired member of the Northern Ireland Public Service Alliance trade union and the Greenisland Presbyterian Church where he and his wife Sandra are both Elders. He is a former long-serving member and Chair of the Boards of Governors of Carrickfergus Central and Silverstream Primary Schools. Stewart is a Winston Churchill Fellow, having completed his fellowship on: ‘How to create and sustain a small business’. He travelled to the New England States of the United States for his fellowship in 1999. Prior to his election to the NI Assembly, he worked as Arbitration Secretary at the Northern Ireland Labour Relations Agency.

References

External links
Link to Alliance Party Website Profile
Official Website

Living people
1950 births
People from County Antrim
Alliance Party of Northern Ireland councillors
Alliance Party of Northern Ireland MLAs
Members of Carrickfergus Borough Council
Mayors of places in Northern Ireland
Northern Ireland MLAs 2011–2016
Northern Ireland MLAs 2016–2017
Northern Ireland MLAs 2017–2022
Northern Ireland MLAs 2022–2027